Thornton Abbey railway station is close to the site of Thornton Abbey in North Lincolnshire, England.

It was built by the Great Grimsby and Sheffield Junction Railway in 1849, replacing a temporary one at Thornton Curtis. It also serves the village of Thornton Curtis and is managed by East Midlands Railway.

Services
All services at Thornton Abbey are operated by East Midlands Railway using Class 156 DMUs.

There is a Sunday service of four trains per day in each direction during the summer months only. There are no winter Sunday services at the station.

Services were previously operated by Northern Trains but transferred to East Midlands Railway as part of the May 2021 timetable changes.

References

References

Sources

External links

Railway stations in the Borough of North Lincolnshire
DfT Category F2 stations
Former Great Central Railway stations
Railway stations in Great Britain opened in 1849
Railway stations served by East Midlands Railway
1849 establishments in England
Former Northern franchise railway stations